Craugastor gollmeri is a species of frog in the family Craugastoridae.
It is found in Costa Rica and Panama.
Its natural habitats are subtropical or tropical moist lowland forests, subtropical or tropical moist montane forests, rural gardens, and heavily degraded former forest.
It is threatened by habitat loss.

References

gollmeri
Amphibians described in 1863
Taxa named by Wilhelm Peters
Taxonomy articles created by Polbot